This article displays the squads of the teams that will participate at the EuroBasket 2011. Each team consists of 12 players.

Age and club as of the start of the tournament, 31 August 2011.

Group A

Great Britain

|}
| valign="top" |
 Head coach

 Assistant coaches

Legend
(C) Team captain
Club – describes lastclub before the tournament
Age – describes ageon 31 August 2011
|}

Lithuania

|}
| valign="top" |
 Head coach

 Assistant coaches

 Athletic trainer

Legend
(C) Team captain
Club – describes lastclub before the tournament
Age – describes ageon 31 August 2011
|}

Poland

 
|}
| valign="top" |
 Head coach

Legend
(C) Team captain
Club – describes lastclub before the tournament
Age – describes ageon 31 August 2011
|}

Portugal

 
|}
| valign="top" |
 Head coach

Legend
(C) Team captain
Club – describes lastclub before the tournament
Age – describes ageon 31 August 2011
|}

Spain

|}
| valign="top" |
 Head coach

 Assistant coaches

 Trainers

Legend
(C) Team captain
Club – describes lastclub before the tournament
Age – describes ageon 31 August 2011
|}

Turkey

|}
| valign="top" |
 Head coach

 Assistant coaches

Legend
(C) Team captain
Club – describes lastclub before the tournament
Age – describes ageon 31 August 2011
|}

Group B

France

 
|}
| valign="top" |
 Head coach

 Assistant coaches

Legend
(C) Team captain
Club – describes lastclub before the tournament
Age – describes ageon 31 August 2011
|}

Germany

 
|}
| valign="top" |
 Head coach

 Assistant coaches

Legend
(C) Team captain
Club – describes lastclub before the tournament
Age – describes ageon 31 August 2011
|}

Israel

|}
| valign="top" |
 Head coach

 Assistants coach
Oded Kattash
Dan Shamir

Legend
(C) Team captain
Club – describes lastclub before the tournament
Age – describes ageon 31 August 2011
|}

Italy

|}
| valign="top" |
 Head coach
 
 Assistant coaches
 
 

Legend
(C) Team captain
Club – describes lastclub before the tournament
Age – describes ageon 31 August 2011
|}

Latvia

 
|}
| valign="top" |
 Head coach

Legend
(C) Team captain
Club – describes lastclub before the tournament
Age – describes ageon 31 August 2011
|}

Serbia

|}
| valign="top" |
 Head coach

 Assistant coaches
 

Legend
(C) Team captain
Club – describes lastclub before the tournament
Age – describes ageon 31 August 2011
|}

Group C

Bosnia and Herzegovina

Croatia

Finland

 
|}
| valign="top" |
 Head coach

Legend
(C) Team captain
Club – describes lastclub before the tournament
Age – describes ageon 31 August 2011
|}

Greece

|}
| valign="top" |
 Head coach

Legend
(C) Team captain
Club – describes lastclub before the tournament
Age – describes ageon 31 August 2011
|}

Macedonia

|}
| valign="top" |
 Head coach

Legend
(C) Team captain
Club – describes lastclub before the tournament
Age – describes ageon 31 August 2011
|}

Montenegro

Group D

Belgium

Bulgaria

 

 
|}
| valign="top" |
 Head coach

Legend
(C) Team captain
Club – describes lastclub before the tournament
Age – describes ageon 31 August 2011
|}

Georgia

 

 
|}
| valign="top" |
 Head coach

Legend
(C) Team captain
Club – describes lastclub before the tournament
Age – describes ageon 31 August 2011
|}

Russia

}

 
|}
| valign="top" |
 Head coach
 David Blatt
 Assistant coach

Legend
(C) Team captain
Club – describes lastclub before the tournament
Age – describes ageon 31 August 2011
|}

Slovenia

Ukraine

 

 
|}
| valign="top" |
 Head coach

Legend
(C) Team captain
Club – describes lastclub before the tournament
Age – describes ageon 31 August 2011
|}

References

squads
2011